Montesquieu is a commune in the department of Lot-et-Garonne and the region of Nouvelle-Aquitaine, southwestern France.

See also
Communes of the Lot-et-Garonne department

References

Communes of Lot-et-Garonne
Montesquieu